Ari Michael Wolfe (born January 7, 1971) is an American sportscaster. Wolfe currently calls events for ESPN, Stadium Network, Tennis Channel, the Kansas City Chiefs, Pac-12 Networks and NBC Sports. Additionally, Wolfe serves as an anchor and reporter for the NFL Network. Wolfe is a 2-time NBC Sports Olympic broadcaster and a 2-time Emmy award winner for his work in college sports.

Early life and career
Wolfe was born in Philadelphia, Pennsylvania and raised in Madison, Wisconsin. He currently resides in Los Angeles, California. Wolfe graduated from Emory University in 1994. He later earned his master's degree at USC. As a student Wolfe did both play-by-play and color commentary for the Trojans' basketball, football, and baseball teams on KSCR (104.7 FM) in Los Angeles. He also hosted the sports talk show Blackjack and the Wolfe Attack.

Before moving into commentary, Wolfe worked out of Los Angeles as a Highlight Coordinator, creating highlight packages of NFL football games for Fox NFL Sunday. He held similar responsibilities for Fox’s coverage of the NHL and MLB.

Broadcasting career
Since graduating from USC in 1997, Wolfe has called games in college and professional sports. He currently calls events for NFL Network, ESPN, the Kansas City Chiefs, CBS Sports Network, Tennis Channel, Pac-12 Networks, NBC Sports and Stadium Network. Since 2009, Wolfe also serves as an anchor and reporter for NFL Network. He is a two-time Emmy winner.

Beginning in 2019, Wolfe is the play-by-play announcer for the Kansas City Chiefs preseason games. He previously has called preseason games for the Philadelphia Eagles in 2005 and for the Minnesota Vikings from 2007-2011.  For the 2014 NFL preseason, Wolfe called games with Kurt Warner for NFL Network broadcasts.

Wolfe currently calls college football and college basketball for ESPN and Stadium Network with games airing on Facebook.  He joined Stadium in 2014 and his primary role is calling Mountain West Conference games.  2009 marked the beginning of Wolfe's work for MTN and BTN. Wolfe served as the play-by-play announcer for football, and men's basketball games. Wolfe left BTN following the 2010 season, while his work with the Mountain West Conference continued until the network ceased operations in 2012. Wolfe has since called Mountain West football games for Root Sports and the Mountain West Network. Wolfe won his 2nd Emmy for his work during the 2014 Mountain West college football season on Root Sports.

Wolfe began calling tennis for the Tennis Channel in 2017 and at the start of 2019, he agreed to a long-term contract to work at Tennis Channel thru 2022.  For the 2019 Mountain West Tennis Championships, Wolfe served as the analyst on the Mountain West Digital Network.

In 1998, Wolfe began his play-by-play career as the voice of the Albany Firebirds, serving in that role for six seasons. When the Firebirds left the Arena Football League (AFL), Wolfe was hired to be the play-by-play voice for the Philadelphia Soul, where he remained until 2008. Wolfe has always been synonymous with the AFL. Leading up to 2018 season Wolfe called arena games for CBS Sports Network, OLN, ESPN, Versus and NFL Network.

From 2005 to 2009 Wolfe was the play-by-play man for Louisville Cardinals football and men's basketball games. It was while working with the Cardinals in 2005 that Wolfe won his first Sports Emmy for Outstanding Play-by-Play and his overall composite work. In addition to play-by-play at Louisville, Wolfe also hosted Courtside with Rick Pitino and Kickoff with Coach K.

Wolfe's impressive resume led ESPN to hire him as the play-by-play man for the Madden Challenge in 2007, shown on Super Bowl Sunday on ESPN2. He was also hired as one of their play-by-play men for the Big East Conference.

In 2009, Wolfe was hired by Universal Sports as the play-by-play announcer for events including World Cup of Rowing, the Women's World Ice Championships, and the World Table Tennis Championships. His work at Universal led NBC Sports to use him as their play-by-play announcer for Table Tennis at the 2012 Summer Olympics.  Wolfe returned to NBC in 2016 to call Table Tennis for the Rio Olympics, and subsequently called for the Women's Table Tennis World Cup on ESPN in the fall of 2016.

During 2014, Wolfe worked for NFL Network, ESPN, CBS, Root Sports, Time Warner Cable Sports Net, Campus Insiders and the Mountain West Network.

References

1971 births
Living people
American radio sports announcers
American television sports announcers
Arena football announcers
ArenaBowl broadcasters
College baseball announcers in the United States
College basketball announcers in the United States
College football announcers
Emory University alumni
Minnesota Vikings announcers
National Football League announcers
NFL Europe broadcasters
Olympic Games broadcasters
Philadelphia Eagles announcers
Sportspeople from Madison, Wisconsin
Sportspeople from Philadelphia
USC Trojans baseball announcers
USC Trojans men's basketball announcers
USC Trojans football announcers
University of Southern California alumni